BDJ may refer to:
 British Dental Journal
 Syamsudin Noor Airport
 Bund Deutscher Jugend